Yuricich is a surname. Notable people with the surname include:

Matthew Yuricich (1923–2012), American special effects artist
Richard Yuricich (born 1942), American special effects artist, brother of Matthew